Norman McRae (September 26, 1947 – July 25, 2003) was an American professional baseball player, a right-handed pitcher who appeared in 22 Major League games for the 1969–1970 Detroit Tigers.

McRae attended Elizabeth High School and signed with the Tigers in 1966 as an undrafted free agent. He moved through the Tiger farm system and after his fourth minor league campaign he was given a three-game, late-season trial in 1969. The following year, he had mid- and late-season auditions with Detroit as a relief pitcher, working in 19 games. Although he failed to record a decision or a save, McRae had some success, allowing 26 hits in  innings pitched and fashioning a 2.87 earned run average — although he issued more bases on balls (25) than he had strikeouts (16).

He then was included in a controversial off-season trade. On October 9, 1970, the 23-year-old McRae was sent to the Washington Senators with former Cy Young Award winning pitcher Denny McLain, outfielder Elliott Maddox and third baseman Don Wert for pitchers Joe Coleman and Jim Hannan, shortstop Ed Brinkman and third baseman Aurelio Rodríguez.

The trade was a boon for the Tigers, and a catastrophe for the Senators. McLain, just two years removed from winning 31 games for the world champion 1968 Tigers (and one year after notching 24 victories for Detroit's 1969 club), had been suspended for much of the 1970 season by Commissioner of Baseball Bowie Kuhn on gambling allegations and had won only three of eight decisions. Washington owner Bob Short, who was his own general manager and made the trade, would spend much of the season petitioning the American League, successfully, to move the franchise to Dallas-Fort Worth. Meanwhile, Coleman would twice win 20 games for the Tigers and pitch for them through 1976, while Brinkman and Rodríguez would anchor the left side of the Tiger infield for several seasons, including  when Detroit won the American League East Division title.

McRae, for his part, made no contribution to the Senators and never appeared in an official game for them. He spent the remainder of his career in the minor leagues. He was traded with Jim Foor from the Tigers to the Pirates for Dick Sharon at the Winter Meetings on November 27, 1972. In his 22 MLB games, all with the Tigers, he allowed 28 hits and 12 earned runs in  innings pitched, with 26 bases on balls and 19 strikeouts.

See also
Bob Short

References

External links

1947 births
2003 deaths
African-American baseball players
Baseball players from New Jersey
Daytona Beach Islanders players
Denver Bears players
Detroit Tigers players
Elizabeth High School (New Jersey) alumni
Major League Baseball pitchers
Montgomery Rebels players
Sportspeople from Elizabeth, New Jersey
Rocky Mount Leafs players
Toledo Mud Hens players
20th-century African-American sportspeople
21st-century African-American people
Florida Instructional League Tigers players
American expatriate baseball players in Mexico
Dorados de Chihuahua players